The Clarkstown radio transmitter is a longwave radio transmitter in County Meath, Ireland. At 248 metres high, it is more than double the height of the Spire in Dublin.

Constructed in 1988 for the transmission of Atlantic 252 on 252 kHz, it uses one 248-metre (814') high guyed steel framework mast with triangular cross section, insulated against ground. The original transmitters were two 300 kilowatt Continental Solid State transmitters built by Varian Associates of Dallas. These were replaced in 2007 by a single 300 kilowatt Transradio TRAM 300L transmitter. The ground around the mast and the entire transmission site bed are lined with copper for conductivity. The site has an ITU-cleared transmission power of 500 kW by day and 100 kW at night but is now only capable of operating at 300 kW by day and 100 kW at night.

Atlantic 252 ceased operations on 20 December 2001 and sports radio station TEAMtalk 252 briefly took over the frequency for a few months in 2002. The transmitter was later taken over by RTÉ Networks Limited (now 2RN). It is now used for the AM version of RTÉ Radio 1 on 252 kHz, and has been the sole source of RTÉ Radio 1 on AM since 24 March 2008, when the medium wave Tullamore transmitter on 567 kHz was taken off air.

In 2007, the transmitter was carrying a Digital Radio Mondiale multiplex overnight, featuring Radio 1, RTÉ Digital Radio Sport, RTÉ Digital Radio News and the World Radio Network, before reverting to AM transmission for the daytime. DRM tests have since ceased, and AM transmissions now operate full-time once again.

On 24 September 2014, RTÉ announced that broadcasting of RTÉ Radio 1 on 252 kHz would cease on 27 October 2014,  however following representations from Irish listeners in the UK and others, that date was postponed and as of 2023 the transmitter is still on the air.

Timeline

 1988 - Construction of Clarkstown Transmitter by Radio Tara (RTÉ/RTL)
 1989 - Launch of Atlantic 252 on 1 September 1989, pop station aimed at UK and Irish market
 2001 - Closure of Atlantic 252, 20 December 2001
 2002 - Launch of TEAMtalk 252 aimed at UK and Irish market
 2002 - TEAMtalk 252 ceased broadcasting on 30 June 2002
 2002 - RTÉ take over the running of the Clarkstown Transmitter following demise of TEAMtalk
 2004 - Official launch of RTÉ Radio 1 on Long Wave 252, January 2004
 2004 - While the Tullamore transmitter was offline for maintenance Clarkstown provided Radio 1's AM service
 2007 - Major upgrade of Transmitter
 2007 - RTÉ run DRM tests, in parallel with Analogue AM service
 2008 - 24 March, Closure of RTÉ Medium Wave service leaving 252 Long Wave as the only AM Broadcast by RTÉ, services which were on Medium Wave transferred to Long Wave.
 2008 - 1 December, launch of RTÉ Radio 1 Extra which was extra content not broadcast on FM was now relayed on Long Wave 252
 2014 - RTÉ announce plans to close Long Wave 252, September 2014
 2014 - RTÉ announce postponement of closure plans until 2017 
 2017 - RTÉ announce postponement of closure plans until June 2019
 2019 - Oireachtas Communications Committee announce the rebuilding of the antenna system and postponement of closure plans at least until 2021

Gallery

See also
List of tallest structures in the world
List of tallest structures in Ireland

References

External links
https://web.archive.org/web/20070929125352/http://tx.mb21.co.uk/features/252/summerhill.shtml – pictures from mb21
 
http://www.skyscraperpage.com/diagrams/?b45496
IAA information on the mast here (page 20).
https://web.archive.org/web/20041113154742/http://members.lycos.co.uk/gregsradio/newpage0.html

Buildings and structures in County Meath
Radio masts and towers in Europe
Mass media in the Republic of Ireland
Transmitter sites in Ireland
Towers completed in 1988
1988 establishments in Ireland